The Aalto University is a Finnish university established on January 1, 2010, by the merger of the Helsinki University of Technology, the Helsinki School of Economics, and the University of Art and Design Helsinki. This article intends to present the notable alumni and people linked to the Aalto University and its three founding schools.

In the list are included graduates and full professors. Visiting professors have not been added and non-graduated students only in rare cases where so is stated. It is notable that before 2005 there in general were no bachelor's degrees awarded at the universities.

Helsinki University of Technology

 Aino Aalto
 Elissa Aalto
 Alvar Aalto (1898–1976), architect (M.Sc. 1921)
 Eric Adlercreutz, architect (M.Sc.)
 Matti Alahuhta, CEO of Kone (D.Sc.)
 Kaj Arnö (M.Sc.), of MySQL 
 Kim Borg, operatic bass and vocal pedagogue (M.Sc.)
 Erik Bryggman, architect (M.Sc.)
 Marco Casagrande, architect (M.Sc.)
 Torolf Eklund, aeronautical engineer
 Aarne Ervi, architect (M.Sc.)
 Kristian Gullichsen, architect (M.Sc.)
 Raimo P. Hämäläinen, professor of applied mathematics and operations research
 Riitta Hari, professor of biomedical engineering, member of both the Academy of Finland and the United States National Academy of Sciences
 Satu Hassi, MEP, former MP and minister (Lic.Sc.)
 Vilhelm Helander, architect (M.Sc.)
 Signe Hornborg, first female architect in Europe
 Kari Jormakka, architect (M.Sc.)
 Jyrki Kasvi, MP (D.Sc.)
 Teuvo Kohonen, professor emeritus of computer science, neural networks pioneer
 Gustaf Komppa, professor of chemistry
 Ora Lassila computer scientist, researcher
 Juha Leiviskä, architect (M.Sc.)
 Markku Leskelä, professor of inorganic chemistry at University of Helsinki; ISI Highly Cited Researcher (D.Sc.)
 Henrik Lilius, professor in architecture
 Yrjö Lindegren, architect (M.Sc.)
 Olli Lounasmaa, professor of physics
 Marjo Matikainen-Kallström, MP and olympic gold medalist (M.Sc.)
 Hjalmar Mellin, professor of mathematics, rector (1904–1907)
 Mårten Mickos, of MySQL
 Carl O. Nordling, architect (M.Sc.)
 Gunnar Nordström, professor of physics
 Kaisa Nyberg, professor of computer science, cryptologist
 Erkki Oja, professor of computer science
 Jorma Ollila, Chairman of Royal Dutch Shell and Nokia; restructurer of Nokia as CEO (M.Sc.)
 Simo Paavilainen, architect and professor
 Juhani Pallasmaa, architect (M.Sc. and professor)
 Kai Puolamäki, researcher
 Uolevi Raade, industrialist (M.Sc.)
 Antti Räisänen, professor in electrical engineering
 Viljo Revell, architect (M.Sc.)
 Jorma Rissanen, information theorist (D.Sc.)
 Aarno Ruusuvuori, architect (M.Sc.)
 Martin Saarikangas, industrialist (M.Sc.)
 Eliel Saarinen (1873–1950), architect; father of Eero Saarinen
 Esa Saarinen, professor of applied philosophy
 Niklas Savander, corporate leader (M.Sc.)
 Risto Siilasmaa, founder and Chairman of F-Secure (M.Sc.)
 Arto Sipinen, architect (M.Sc.)
 J. S. Sirén, architect (M.Sc.)
 Kaija Siren, architect (M.Sc.)
 Frans Anatolius Sjöström, architect (M.Sc.)
 Gunnar Taucher, architect (M.Sc.)
 Antti Tuuri, writer (M.Sc.)
 Martti Välikangas, architect (M.Sc.)
 Artturi Virtanen, professor of biochemistry, Nobel laureate (Chemistry, 1945)
 Wilhelm Wahlforss, industrialist (M.Sc.)
 Björn Westerlund, industrialist (M.Sc.)
 Monty Widenius, of MySQL
 Waldemar Wilenius, architect (M.Sc.)
 Tatu Ylönen, designer of the Secure Shell (Lic.Sc.)

Helsinki School of Economics

 Sari Baldauf, corporate leader
 Kare Casals, entrepreneur
 Kaj Chydenius, composer
 Lauri Kaukonen, corporate leader
 Mikko Kosonen, President of the Finnish Innovation Fund Sitra, PhD alumnus
 Kim Kuusi, composer
 Arto Lahti, professor and independent presidential candidate
 Barbro Owens-Kirkpatrick (BA)
 Jussi Pajunen, mayor of Helsinki
 Sirpa Pietikäinen (MBA)
 Kirsi Piha, former Member of Parliament (Finland); former Member of European Parliament
 Timo Santalainen, adjunct professor
 Lisa Sounio, CEO of dopplr
 Taneli Tikka, entrepreneur
 Erkki Tuomioja, Member of Parliament (Finland); former Minister of Foreign Affairs (2000–2007 and 2011–2015)
 Mārtiņš Staķis, Mayor of Riga

The University of Art and Design Helsinki

 Eero Aarnio, designer
 Umayya Abu-Hanna, cultural active, columnist and writer
 Pedro Aibéo, researcher in Architectural Democracy
 Kari Asikainen, designer
 Aleksi Bardy, director
 Elina Brotherus, photography artist
 Kaj Franck, designer
 Miklos Gaál, photographer and graphics artist
 Klaus Härö, film director
 Samu Heikkilä, film editor
 Helena Hietanen, artist
 Pekka Himanen, philosopher, professor of creative economy
 Kirsti Ilvessalo, textile artist
 Harri Koskinen, designer
 Yrjö Kukkapuro, designer
 Mika Launis, illustrator
 Stefan Lindfors, designer
 Marita Liulia, performance and video artist
 Kiba Lumberg, artist
 Susanna Majuri, photography artist
 Olli Mannermaa, designer
 Leo Mechelin, statesman, previous president of the school
 Eero Nelimarkka, painter
 Jyrki Parantainen, professor of photography
 Timo Saarnio, designer
 Aleksi Salmenperä, film director
 Timo Sarpaneva, designer
 Magnus Scharmanoff, photography artist
 Yrjö Sotamaa, rector
 Minna Sundberg, illustrator
 Ilmari Tapiovaara, designer
 Lauri Törhönen, film director
 Katja Tukiainen, artist and cartoonist
 Peter von Bagh, professor of film history
 Tapio Wirkkala, designer

Aalto University foundation board
The university is governed by the seven-member Aalto University Foundation Board, currently consisting of:
 Dr. Patrick Aebischer (President of Ecole Polytechnique Fédérale de Lausanne (EPFL))
 Dr. Matti Alahuhta, Chair (President of Kone Corporation) 
 Dr. Anne Brunila (Executive Vice President, Corporate Relations and Sustainability, Fortum Oyj)
 Dr. Bengt R. Holmström (Professor, MIT)
 Dr. Marja Makarow (Professor, Univ. Helsinki, ERC)
 Dr. Saku Mantere (Professor, Hanken School of Economics) 
 Dr. Anna Valtonen (Rector, Umeå Institute of Design )

Former members of the foundation board: 
 Dr. Robert A. Brown (President, Boston University)

References

Aalto University